The 1971 Buenos Aires 1000 Kilometers was the opening round of the 1971 International Championship for Makes season.  It took place at the Buenos Aires circuit No.15, Argentina, on January 10, 1971.  Grand tourer class cars did not participate in this event.

Scuderia Ferrari driver Ignazio Giunti was killed during the race.  He was leading the race when his car ran into the back of the disabled Matra driver Jean-Pierre Beltoise was pushing to the pits. Both cars were caught on fire and Giunti was unable to escape.

Official results
Class winners in bold.  Cars failing to complete 70% of the winner's distance marked as Not Classified (NC).

Statistics
 Pole Position - #32 J.W. Automotive - 1:52.70
 Fastest Lap - #30 J.W. Automotive - 1:51.53
 Average Speed - 186.229 km/h

References

 

Buenos Aires
1000 km Buenos Aires
Buenos Aires